Evidence Based Library and Information Practice (EBLIP) is an open access peer-reviewed academic journal covering topics related to library and information science. It is published quarterly by the University of Alberta Library and was established in 2006. EBLIP publishes original research and commentary, as well as reviews of previously published research, on the topic of evidence based library and information practice.

Abstracting and indexing information
Evidence Based Library and Information Practice is abstracted and indexed in Scopus, Library Literature and Information Science, Library, Information Science & Technology Abstracts, and Library and Information Science Abstracts, among others.

See also
 :Category:Library science journals
 Open access in Canada

References

External links
 
 

Library and information science journals
Evidence-based practices
Open access journals
University of Alberta
Quarterly journals
English-language journals
Publications established in 2006